Joseph Griffin Mulbarger (March 2, 1895October 31, 1951) was a professional American football player who played offensive lineman for seven seasons for the Columbus Panhandles/Tigers.

References

1895 births
1951 deaths
Players of American football from Columbus, Ohio
American football offensive linemen
Columbus Panhandles players
Columbus Tigers players